Tristen (born Tristen Gaspadarek, November 23, 1983) is an American singer-songwriter and musician. She has released five albums: Teardrops and Lollipops (2008), Charlatans at the Garden Gate (2011), C A V E S (2013), Sneaker Waves (2017), and Aquatic Flowers (2021). She also performed as a member of Jenny Lewis's live band in 2015.

Biography
After graduating from De Paul University in 2007, where she studied relational group and organizational theories of communication, she moved to Nashville, Tennessee to immerse herself in its music scene.

Tristen's first EP was an independent release, a collection of lo-fi demos titled Teardrops and Lollipops that was completed in 2008. She recorded the homemade EP in her Nashville apartment, burning the CD's herself and packaging them in unique, hand-sewn felt sleeves to sell at her shows.

In February 2011 she released her label debut Charlatans at the Garden Gate, which Rolling Stone magazine praised for its "catchy refrains with multiple meanings," and "ear-tugging melodies with hidden hooks." They interpreted the album's sound as "vintage rockabilly and girl group pop" and called Tristen "an artist worth watching." Slant Magazine reviewed Charlatans at the Garden Gate, stating that "the basic mastery of these songs, the way they skip between styles and voices, while maintaining a strict level of lyrical and vocal quality, is a great accomplishment in itself, especially on a debut." The album was also recognized favorably by NPR, Spin Magazine, The A.V. Club, and Paste Magazine, among others.

Her follow-up, C A V E S, was released in October 2013. Stylistically the album differed from the prominent folk sound of Charlatans with the new addition of drum machines and synths. American Songwriter said Tristen had "evolved her sound ... cranking up the complexity, craft and drama; mixing futuristic moments with quirky lullabies and the same biting tongue, sacrificing folk references for ’80s touch points." It was recorded partly in Nashville by Battle Tapes Recording engineer Jeremy Ferguson, partly in Omaha, Nebraska by Mike Mogis (Bright Eyes, M Ward) and was mixed by synth-pop pioneer Stephen Hague (New Order, Pet Shop Boys). Just like her previous album, C A V E S was named "Best Local Album of 2013". by the Nashville Scene Critic's Poll and in the "Top 50 Albums of 2013" by American Songwriter. SPIN Magazine said the sound of C A V E S had recast the songwriter as "a synth pop siren."

Tristen's fourth album, Sneaker Waves, was released in July 2017. The title was taken from the name of a large, powerful coastal wave known to appear without warning, periodically sweeping innocent bystanders out to sea. Tristen said she found the phenomenon of the sneaker wave to feel like a metaphor for life and death and a suitable album title. In making the album, Tristen and her husband and collaborator Buddy Hughen decided to record at their home studio in Nashville, handling nearly everything but the rhythm section and orchestral accompaniment. The songs on Sneaker Waves were described by Charleston City Paper as showing "traces of twang but more often than not seem to take the ambitious arrangements on C A V E S and filter them through a rich, timeless blend of garage rock, atmospheric country, [and] '60s girl group flourishes." Sneaker Waves was well-received by critics, described by Rolling Stone as having "Nilsson-worthy power balladry," while NPR's Ann Powers put it in her list of "Top 10 Underheard Albums Of 2017" and called it "bursting with great melodies and hooky arrangements that tickle the ear and won’t leave your brain alone."

Since the release of Charlatans at the Garden Gate Tristen has toured North America with artists including Those Darlins, The Elected, Justin Townes Earle, Ezra Furman and the Harpoons, and Vanessa Carlton. In March 2014, she opened for Television in Nashville.

In 2015, Tristen was featured in the documentary The Moment: Bonnaroo, about the music festival.

In 2016, Tristen released a chap book of poetry, Saturnine.

Tristen announced her fifth album, Aquatic Flowers, would be released June 4, 2021 by Mama Bird Recording Co.

Discography

Albums

EPs

Singles

Collaborations

Videography

Film and television

Books

References

External links

 

Living people
1983 births
American pop musicians
Musicians from Chicago
Musicians from Nashville, Tennessee
DePaul University alumni